ZZAJ was a Swedish pop group, active at between 1986 and 1993. Main group members were singer Anna Nederdal and guitarist/composer/producer Billy Bolero (Lars Hansson). The sound of ZZAJ was a mix of groovy and smooth, close to the sound of Sade. All lyrics were in Swedish. ZZAJ released three albums, ZZAJ (1988), Scirocco (1989) and 3 (1993), before they disbanded. A compilation CD, Epilog, was released in 1995. After the split, Nederdal made another record, with Max Schultz in 1995, and then disappeared from the public eye. However, she now has a MySpace page. Billy Bolero runs a small record company, Bolero Records.

Discography

Albums
 ZZAJ (1988)
 Scirocco (1989)
 3 (1993)
 Epilog (1987–1993) (1995)

Singles
"Om du kommer" (1987)
"Tänker på dig" (1987)
"För min skull?" (1989)
"(Du som var) min bäste vän" (1989)
"Lev nu" (1993)
"Vi hade något" (1993)

References

External links
Anna Nederdal discography
Bolero Records

Swedish pop music groups